Hyland DeAndre Jordan Jr. (born July 21, 1988) is an American professional basketball player for the Denver Nuggets of the National Basketball Association (NBA). He played one season of college basketball for the Texas A&M Aggies.

Jordan was selected by the Los Angeles Clippers in the second round of the 2008 NBA draft with the 35th overall pick. He spent ten seasons with the Clippers before signing with the Dallas Mavericks in free agency in July 2018. He was traded to the New York Knicks in January 2019 and joined the Brooklyn Nets in July of the same year. He was dealt to the Detroit Pistons in September 2021 and reached a contract buyout agreement before signing with the Los Angeles Lakers in the same month. He was waived by the Lakers in March 2022 and subsequently joined the 76ers.

Jordan is a three-time All-NBA and two-time NBA All-Defensive Team member, and has twice led the league in rebounding. In 2017, he was named an NBA All-Star for the first time. , Jordan holds the NBA record for highest career field goal percentage at 67.31 percent. He is the Clippers' franchise leader in games played, rebounds, and blocks.

High school career
Jordan attended Episcopal High School through his junior year. Jordan averaged 15.0 points, 12.0 rebounds, and 4.0 blocks as a sophomore; and 16.5 points, 14.0 rebounds, and 7.0 blocks as a junior. Jordan transferred to Christian Life Center Academy for his senior year, where he averaged 26.1 points, 15.2 rebounds, and 8.1 blocks per game. He was a third-team Parade All-American, named to the first-team All-Greater Houston squad by the Houston Chronicle and was a two-time all-state selection. At Christian Life Center, Jordan posted a career-high 37 points in a game and also set the school record for most blocks in a game with 20.

Coming out of high school, Jordan was rated as the number-eight overall prospect, the number-two center in the country, and the number-one prep player in Texas by Rivals.com. Jordan was recruited by Florida, Florida State, Indiana, Texas, Texas A&M, LSU, Kentucky, and others.

In the summer of 2007, Jordan played for Team USA at the 2007 Under-19 World Championships in Serbia. Jordan played only nine minutes per game. The team finished second with an 8–1 record.

College career
Before Jordan arrived at Texas A&M University in College Station, Aggies head basketball coach Billy Gillispie left the school to take the head coaching position at Kentucky. Jordan chose to honor his commitment to the university.

Jordan started 21 of 35 games in his freshman season at Texas A&M. He averaged 20 minutes and 1.3 blocks per game. In those games, he shot a team-high of 61.7 percent in field goals, but a team-low of 43.7 percent in free throws. Most of his field goals, however, were within a few feet from the basket. He finished the season averaging 7.9 points and 6.0 rebounds. He made the Big 12 All-Rookie Team for his efforts. After the season, he declared for the 2008 NBA draft.

Prior to the draft, draftexpress.com, a third-party NBA draft website, listed Jordan's strengths and weaknesses. A few strengths include "incredible physical specimen", "defensive potential", "incredible upside", and "freakish athlete". Some weaknesses include "not productive", "poor fundamentals", "mediocre footwork", and "high bust potential". The website also projected him to be picked at No. 16 by the Philadelphia 76ers. Other mock drafts had him projected to be picked at No. 10 by the New Jersey Nets or at No. 11 by the Indiana Pacers due to his attractive ability to run the floor. ESPN's Chad Ford had him going to the Memphis Grizzlies at pick No. 28 in the first round.

Professional career

Los Angeles Clippers (2008–2018)

Early years (2008–2013) 

Jordan was selected with the 35th overall pick by the Los Angeles Clippers in the 2008 NBA draft. Due to injuries among the Clippers' low-post players, Jordan was pushed into the starting lineup for the January 19, 2009 game against the Minnesota Timberwolves. In his first game as a starter, he recorded six blocks, 10 rebounds, and eight points in 34 minutes of play. In the January 21, 2009 game against the Los Angeles Lakers, he played 43 minutes and recorded a career-high 23 points. This included 10 dunks, which had only been accomplished by two others players (Dwight Howard and Shaquille O'Neal) over the past 10 NBA seasons.
On December 11, 2011, Jordan signed an offer sheet with the Golden State Warriors reportedly worth $43 million over four years. However, one day later, the Clippers matched the offer to keep him.

For the 2011–12 season, Jordan changed his jersey number from 9 to 6. On December 25, 2011, Jordan recorded a career-high eight blocks against the Golden State Warriors in an opening day 105–86 victory.

During the 2012–13 season, Jordan's free-throw percentage dropped from 52.5% to 38.6%, one of his career worsts. However, he led the league in field-goal percentage, shooting 64.3%. This was his first season playing all 82 games.

All-NBA and All-Defensive honors (2013–2016) 

In 2013, Jordan was selected to Team USA's minicamp in Las Vegas. On November 29, 2013, Jordan recorded a career-high nine blocks in the 104–98 victory against the Sacramento Kings. On January 3, 2014, Jordan scored a career-high 25 points in a 119–112 victory against the Dallas Mavericks. With 13.6 rebounds per game, he was the league's rebounding leader for the 2013–14 season.

On April 29, 2014, Jordan became the first NBA player with at least 25 points, 18 rebounds, and four blocked shots in a playoff game since Tim Duncan in 2008.

On February 9, 2015, Jordan recorded 22 points and a career-high 27 rebounds in the 115–98 win over the Dallas Mavericks. On March 13, in a 99–129 loss to the Dallas Mavericks, Jordan made his first career three-pointer early in the first quarter. On May 21, Jordan was named to the All-NBA third team. Jordan became the fifth player in NBA history to average at least 10 points, 15 rebounds, one steal, and two blocks during the regular season. It was last accomplished by Moses Malone during the 1982–83 season.

Despite verbally agreeing to sign a four-year, $80 million contract with the Dallas Mavericks on July 3, 2015, Jordan began having second thoughts just days later, and on July 8, a number of Clippers personnel flew to Houston for a meeting with Jordan to convince him to back out of his Mavericks deal. Hours later, Jordan officially re-signed with the Clippers on a four-year, $88 million contract.

On November 4, 2015, with 13 rebounds against the Golden State Warriors, Jordan became the Clippers' all-time leader in total rebounds, surpassing former Clipper Elton Brand (4,710), finishing the game with 4,711 career rebounds. On November 30, he recorded 18 points and a season-high 24 rebounds against the Portland Trail Blazers, but he also missed 22 free throws (12-of-34) to tie Wilt Chamberlain's NBA record and set a franchise record with 34 attempts. On January 13, he was sidelined for the team's game against the Miami Heat because of pneumonia, ending the NBA's longest active consecutive games played streak at 360.

First All-Star selection and final years with Clippers (2016–2018) 

Jordan helped the Clippers record a league-best 7–1 record to start the 2016–17 season. He played his 600th career game on November 9 against the Portland Trail Blazers, joining Randy Smith (715) and Eric Piatkowski (616) as the only players in franchise history to do so. On December 28, he recorded 13 points and a season-high 25 rebounds in a 102–98 loss to the New Orleans Pelicans. On January 14, 2017, he recorded a season-high 24 points and 21 rebounds in a 113–97 win over the Los Angeles Lakers. He surpassed that mark on January 19 with a career-high 29 points in a 104–101 loss to the Minnesota Timberwolves. On January 26, he was named a Western Conference All-Star reserve for the 2017 NBA All-Star Game, marking the first All-Star selection of his career. During the All-Star Weekend festivities, Jordan participated in the Slam Dunk Contest, but failed to make it past the first round.

In the Clippers' season opener on October 19, 2017, Jordan had 14 points and 24 rebounds in a 108–92 win over the Los Angeles Lakers. On January 4, 2018, he recorded a then season-high 26 points and 17 rebounds in a 127–117 loss to the Oklahoma City Thunder. On January 24, 2018, in a 113–102 loss to the Boston Celtics, Jordan tied Randy Smith (715) for most games played in team history. Two days later, in a 109–100 win over the Memphis Grizzlies, Jordan played his 716th game as a Clipper, surpassing Smith's record. On February 14, 2018, Jordan scored a career-high 30 points to go with 13 rebounds and four steals in a 129–119 win over the Celtics. On March 9, 2018, he had 20 points and 23 rebounds in a 116–102 win over the Cleveland Cavaliers. Jordan averaged 17.1 rebounds in March 2018, just shy of his career high of 17.3 set in March 2015.

Dallas Mavericks (2018–2019)
On July 6, 2018, Jordan signed a one-year deal with the Dallas Mavericks. To begin the season, Jordan had three straight double-doubles, becoming the first Dallas player since Popeye Jones in 1994 to start a season with three straight. On October 28, he recorded 12 points, 19 rebounds and a career-high nine assists in a 113–104 loss to the Utah Jazz, thus recording his sixth double-double in six games to start the season. On November 7, he had 11 points and 12 rebounds in a 117–102 loss to the Jazz, thus collecting at least 10 rebounds for a franchise record 11th straight game. On November 19, he recorded 17 points and a then season-high 20 rebounds in a 98–88 loss to the Memphis Grizzlies. On December 2, he recorded 16 points and a season-high 23 rebounds in a 114–110 win over the Los Angeles Clippers. On December 16, he tied his season high with 23 rebounds in a 120–113 loss to the Sacramento Kings. He had 23 rebounds again on December 22 against the Golden State Warriors.

New York Knicks (2019)
On January 31, 2019, Jordan was traded to the New York Knicks along with Dennis Smith Jr., Wesley Matthews and two future first round draft picks in exchange for Kristaps Porziņģis, Tim Hardaway Jr., Trey Burke and Courtney Lee. On March 15, he recorded 11 points, 13 rebounds and matched a career high with nine assists in a 109–83 loss to the San Antonio Spurs.

Brooklyn Nets (2019–2021)

Team stat leader (2019–2020) 
On July 6, 2019, the Brooklyn Nets signed Jordan to a reported four-year contract worth $40 million. On October 23, he made his debut for the Nets, recording two points, three rebounds, and one assist in 17 minutes of play during a 127–126 overtime loss to the Minnesota Timberwolves. On November 2, he recorded his first double-double of the season, scoring 10 points and 10 rebounds in a 113–109 loss to the Detroit Pistons. On December 21, Jordan logged a season-high 20 rebounds along with 12 points and six assists in a 122–112 win over the Atlanta Hawks. On February 20, 2020, he logged his tenth double-double of the season, grabbing 14 points and 15 rebounds in a 112–104 overtime loss to the Philadelphia 76ers. On June 29, 2020, Jordan announced that he had tested positive for COVID-19 and decided to opt out of playing in the season restart. He finished the 2019–20 season with 13 double-doubles, which was his lowest total since the 2012–13 season. However, he led the Nets in both field goal percentage and rebounds per game.

Playoff absence (2020–2021) 
Jordan made his season debut for the Nets on December 22, 2020, where he logged four points, 11 rebounds, and one assist in a 125–99 win over the Golden State Warriors. On January 18, 2021, he recorded his first double-double of the season, scoring 12 points and 12 rebounds in a 125–123 win over the Milwaukee Bucks. On March 13, he scored a season-high 14 points along with nine rebounds and one block in a 100–95 win over the Detroit Pistons. On April 14, Jordan recorded a season-high 14 rebounds in a 117–123 loss to the Philadelphia 76ers. He did not play in the Nets' final 16 games of the season, and he did not appear at all in the playoffs. Jordan finished the season with only 6 double-doubles, which was his second-lowest season total, only behind his rookie season in 2008–09.

Center LaMarcus Aldridge retired in April 2021, but was medically cleared in September to keep playing, making a return to the Nets for Jordan unlikely. The team re-signed Aldridge on September 3.

Los Angeles Lakers (2021–2022) 
On September 3, 2021, Jordan was traded to the Detroit Pistons in exchange for Sekou Doumbouya and Jahlil Okafor, and he reached a buyout agreement with the team four days later. On September 9, Jordan signed with the Los Angeles Lakers. On March 1, 2022, he was waived by the Lakers.

Philadelphia 76ers (2022) 
On March 3, 2022, Jordan signed with the Philadelphia 76ers, reuniting with former Clippers coach Doc Rivers and former Nets teammate James Harden.

Denver Nuggets (2022–present) 
On July 12, 2022, Jordan signed with the Denver Nuggets. On November 22, Jordan grabbed a season-high 17 rebounds during a 98–97 win over the Dallas Mavericks.

Personal life
Jordan is a Christian. Jordan prays frequently and has spoken about his faith saying, "I know my relationship with Christ, and I know what he has done for me, and that is what I live on." Jordan has a tattoo of Matthew 5:4–5 on his chest, a Christian cross on his left arm, the Serenity Prayer and his own message saying "I thank God for the gift that he has given me. I will honor, sacrifice, and dedicate myself to my talent. I know where I have come from but I know where I am going" on his right arm, and Philippians 4:13 with praying hands and "G.W.O.M" (God Watch Over Me) on his stomach.

His younger brother, Avery Jordan, became a professional football player in the Canadian Football League.

Player profile

Jordan is a strong rebounder, averaging 10.6 rebounds per game in his career and leading the league in two seasons. He is also an excellent post-defender who averages 1.6 blocks per game for his career. Jordan's defensive play has even been compared to the defensive play of Bill Russell, a Hall of Fame center who is considered by many to be one of the greatest defenders and players of all time. On offense, he heavily relies on put-backs and alley-oops to score. He has led the league in field goal percentage in five seasons. However, he is a poor free throw shooter, making just 46% of his shots at the line, leading to opponents exploiting this weakness by intentionally fouling him with the Hack-a-Shaq strategy. Jordan is considered one of the more durable players in the NBA, having played in 360 straight games at one point.

Career statistics

NBA

Regular season

|-
| style="text-align:left;"| 
| style="text-align:left;"| L.A. Clippers
| 53 || 13 || 14.5 || .633 || – || .385 || 4.5 || .2 || .2 || 1.1 || 4.3
|-
| style="text-align:left;"| 
| style="text-align:left;"| L.A. Clippers
| 70 || 12 || 16.2 || .605 || .000 || .375 || 5.0 || .3 || .2 || .9 || 4.8
|-
| style="text-align:left;"| 
| style="text-align:left;"| L.A. Clippers
| 80 || 66 || 25.6 || .686 || .000 || .452 || 7.2 || .5 || .5 || 1.8 || 7.1
|-
| style="text-align:left;"| 
| style="text-align:left;"| L.A. Clippers
| style="background:#cfecec;"| 66* || style="background:#cfecec;"| 66* || 27.2 || .632 || .000 || .525 || 8.3 || .3 || .5 || 2.0 || 7.4
|-
| style="text-align:left;"| 
| style="text-align:left;"| L.A. Clippers
| style="background:#cfecec;"| 82* || style="background:#cfecec;"| 82* || 24.5 ||style="background:#cfecec;"| .643* || – || .386 || 7.2 || .3 || .6 || 1.4 || 8.8
|-
| style="text-align:left;"| 
| style="text-align:left;"| L.A. Clippers
| style="background:#cfecec;"| 82* || style="background:#cfecec;"| 82* || 35.0 || style="background:#cfecec;"| .676* || – || .428 || style="background:#cfecec;"| 13.6* || .9 || 1.0 || 2.5 || 10.4
|-
| style="text-align:left;"| 
| style="text-align:left;"| L.A. Clippers
| style="background:#cfecec;"| 82* || style="background:#cfecec;"| 82* || 34.4 || style="background:#cfecec;"| .710* || .250 || .397 || style="background:#cfecec;"| 15.0* || .7 || 1.0 || 2.2 || 11.5
|-
| style="text-align:left;"| 
| style="text-align:left;"| L.A. Clippers
| 77 || 77 || 33.7 || style="background:#cfecec;"|.703* || .000 || .430 || 13.8 || 1.2 || .7 || 2.3 || 12.7
|-
| style="text-align:left;"| 
| style="text-align:left;"| L.A. Clippers
| 81 || 81 || 31.7 || style="background:#cfecec;"|.714* || .000 || .430 || 13.8 || 1.2 || .6 || 1.7 || 12.7
|-
| style="text-align:left;"| 
| style="text-align:left;"| L.A. Clippers
| 77 || 77 || 31.5 || .645 || – || .580 || 15.2 || 1.5 || .5 || .9 || 12.0
|-
| style="text-align:left;"| 
| style="text-align:left;"| Dallas
| 50 || 50 || 31.1 || .644 || – || .682 || 13.7 || 2.0 || .7 || 1.1 || 11.0
|-
| style="text-align:left;"| 
| style="text-align:left;"| New York
| 19 || 19 || 25.9 || .634 || – || .773 || 11.4 || 3.0 || .5 || 1.1 || 10.9
|-
| style="text-align:left;"| 
| style="text-align:left;"| Brooklyn
| 56 || 6 || 22.0 || .666 || – || .680 || 10.0 || 1.9 || .3 || .9 || 8.3
|-
| style="text-align:left;"| 
| style="text-align:left;"| Brooklyn
| 57 || 43 || 21.9 || .763 || .000 || .500 || 7.5 || 1.6 || .3 || 1.1 || 7.5
|-
| style="text-align:left;"| 
| style="text-align:left;"| L.A. Lakers
| 32 || 19 || 12.8 || .674 || – || .462 || 5.4 || .4 || .3 || .8 || 4.1
|-
| style="text-align:left;"| 
| style="text-align:left;"| Philadelphia
| 16 || 1 || 13.4 || .593 || – || .714 || 5.8 || .5 || .1 || .6 || 4.6
|- class="sortbottom"
| style="text-align:center;" colspan="2"| Career
| 980 || 776 || 26.7 || bgcolor="EOCEF2"|.673 || .083 || .475 || 10.3 || 1.0 || .5 || 1.5 || 9.1

Playoffs

|-
| style="text-align:left;"| 2012
| style="text-align:left;"| L.A. Clippers
| 11 || 11 || 22.6 || .525 || – || .333 || 5.3 || .4 || .6 || 1.6 || 4.5
|-
| style="text-align:left;"| 2013
| style="text-align:left;"| L.A. Clippers
| 6 || 6 || 24.0 || .455 || – || .222 || 6.3 || .2 || .2 || 1.7 || 3.7
|-
| style="text-align:left;"| 2014
| style="text-align:left;"| L.A. Clippers
| 13 || 13 || 34.0 || .730 || – || .434 || 12.5 || .8 || .9 || 2.5 || 9.6
|-
| style="text-align:left;"| 2015
| style="text-align:left;"| L.A. Clippers
| 14 || 14 || 34.4 || .716 || – || .427 || 13.4 || 1.1 || 1.1 || 2.4 || 13.1
|-
| style="text-align:left;"| 2016
| style="text-align:left;"| L.A. Clippers
| 6 || 6 || 33.0 || .632 || – || .373 || 16.3 || 1.8 || 1.2 || 2.7 || 11.7
|-
| style="text-align:left;"| 2017
| style="text-align:left;"| L.A. Clippers
| 7 || 7 || 37.8 || .705 || .000 || .393 || 14.4 || .7 || .4 || .9 || 15.4
|-
| style="text-align:left;"| 2022
| style="text-align:left;"| Philadelphia
| 3 || 2 || 10.2 || 1.000 || – || – || 2.3 || .3 || .0 || .7 || 3.3
|- class="sortbottom"
| style="text-align:center;" colspan="2"| Career
| 60 || 59 || 30.2 ||style="background:#E0CEF2;"|.668 || .000 || .404 || 10.9 || .8 || .8 || 2.0 || 9.5

College

|-
| style="text-align:left;"| 2007–08
| style="text-align:left;"| Texas A&M
| 35 || 21 || 20.1 || .617 || – || .437 || 6.0 || .4 || .2 || 1.3 || 7.9

See also

 List of National Basketball Association career rebounding leaders
 List of National Basketball Association career blocks leaders

References

External links

1988 births
Living people
20th-century African-American sportspeople
21st-century African-American sportspeople
African-American basketball players
African-American Christians
American men's basketball players
Basketball players at the 2016 Summer Olympics
Basketball players from Houston
Brooklyn Nets players
Centers (basketball)
Dallas Mavericks players
Denver Nuggets players
Los Angeles Clippers draft picks
Los Angeles Clippers players
Los Angeles Lakers players
Medalists at the 2016 Summer Olympics
National Basketball Association All-Stars
New York Knicks players
Olympic gold medalists for the United States in basketball
Parade High School All-Americans (boys' basketball)
Philadelphia 76ers players
Texas A&M Aggies men's basketball players
United States men's national basketball team players